Dominic James (born October 5, 1986) is an American professional basketball player for Al-Shamal Sports Club of the Qatari Basketball League.

College career

Freshman season & Big East Rookie of the year
In 2005–06, James came in as one of the best freshman in the country, averaging 15.3 points (second on the team, 13th in the big east, and the best freshman scorer in the big east.), 5.4 assists (his 167 assists were ranked third-overall in the conference and the top freshman, nationally ranked 29th in the nation and the fourth-highest freshman total, also ranked second on the freshman season assists list behind Tony Miller's 221, and James 5.4 assists were also ranked third-overall in the big east.) and 4.5 rebounds and 1.6 steals per game (tied 11th in Big East). He was one of three players at Marquette to start every game, he scored a freshman season scoring record 473 points topping Doc Rivers mark that stood for 25 seasons. while being named Big East Rookie of the Year, unanimous Big East all-rookie team pick, honorable-mention all-big east and collegehoops.net first-team all-rookie honors. On November 19, 2005, he played 37 minutes, scoring 15 against Winthrop to earn all-tournament at the Pepsi blue and gold classic, he was also named big east rookie of the week on November 21 following the first week of the season. James was selected to the great Alaska shootout after scoring 41 points in three games while dishing a career high nine assists against South Carolina on November 26, 2005. James topped his previous career high 28 points with a team leading 29 points at DePaul University on January 17, 2006. James notched his first double-double of the season at the University of Louisville on March 1, 2006, with 16 points and a team leading 11 rebounds.

Sophomore season
Dominic James had another great year in his sophomore season. Coming in as a unanimous preseason all-big east and Was named to the John r. wooden award preseason top 50, Rivals.com preseason all-America first-team and other preseason awards. At the end of the season he was named first-team all-big east and AP Honorable-Mention all-America. On March 3, 2007, James tallied a career high 10 assists while missing eight minutes due to cramps in the Golden Eagles' victory over 12th ranked Pittsburgh. After the 2006–07 season, James entered the 2007 NBA Draft but withdrew on June 17, 2007.

Junior season
During the 2007-08 season he averaged 12.9 points, 4.4 assists and 1.8 steals per game while led to him earning all-big east second-team, rivals.com all-big east second-team and usbwa all-district v team. Was one of 16 finalists for the Bob Cousy Award

Senior Season
His college career was thought to be finished on February 25, 2009 when he broke the fifth metatarsal bone in his left foot in a 93–82 loss to the Connecticut Huskies. However, on March 29, 2009, James was cleared to play in the Golden Eagles' second round matchup against Missouri late on the eve of the game.

Career Accomplishments
 2nd on Marquette's all-time career list in assists (632)
 4th on Marquette's all-time career list in steals (238)
 tied 9th on Marquette's all-time career list in three-point field goals (169)
 5th on Marquette's all-time career list in three-point field goals attempted (581)
 tied 8th on Marquette's all-time career list in free throws attempted (529)
 tied 8th on Marquette's all-time career list in wins (94)
 Marquette Freshman single season record for most points (473, 2005–06)
 2nd on Marquette's single season freshman assist list (167, 2005–06)
 4th on Marquette's all-time career list in points scored (1,749, 2005–09)

Honors

 Big East Rookie of the Year (2006)
 Unanimous Big East All-Rookie Team (2006)
 Honorable-Mention All-Big East (2006)
 Pepsi Blue And Gold Classic All-Tournament Team (2005–06)
 Great Alaska Shootout All-Tournament Team (2005–06)
  CollegeHoops.Net First-Team All-Rookie (2006)
 6x Big East Rookie of the week (2005–06)
 AP Honorable-Mention All-American (2007)
 First-Team All-Big East (2007)
 Naismith Award Finalist (2007)
 Bob Cousy Award Finalist (2007)
 NABC District 1 All-District First-Team (2007) 
 CBE Classic MVP (2006–07)
 USBWA All-District Team (2007)
 Second-Team All-Big East (2008)
 Rivals.Com Second-Team All-Big East (2008)
 NABC District 11 First-Team (2008)
 USBWA All-District V Team (2008)
 Serbian League champion (2012)
 Serbian Cup winner (2012)

Professional career
James went undrafted in the 2009 NBA draft, but was invited to play for the Milwaukee Bucks in the 2009 Las Vegas Summer League. However, James suffered an injury while practicing with the team prior to the start of the Summer League and was consequently removed from the roster. James was later invited to participate in the Bucks' training camp. A little over a week into training camp, James was released after receiving an offer from Turkish team Mersin Büyükşehir Belediyesi SK in October 2009. James spent the 2010–11 season with PBC Lukoil Academic in Bulgaria. In October 2011, James signed with Aris BC in Greece. In January 2012, he left Aris due to unpaid wages and moved to play in Serbia for KK Partizan.
In February 2013 he played for Poitiers Basket 86 (ProA), where he scored 34 points in his first game against one of the best teams of the championship.

Career statistics

College statistics

|-
| align="left" | 2005–06
| align="left" | Marquette Golden Eagles
| 31 || 31 || 32.5 || .431 || .301 || .641 || 4.5 || 5.4 || 1.6 || .4 || 15.3
|-
| align="left" | 2006–07
| align="left" | Marquette Golden Eagles
| 34 || 34 || 33.2 || .384 || .272 || .651 || 3.1 || 4.9 || 1.9 || .1 || 14.9
|-
| align="left" | 2007–08
| align="left" | Marquette Golden Eagles
| 35 || 34 || 30.3 || .398 || .310 || .664 || 2.7 || 4.4 || 1.8 || .2 || 12.9
|-
| align="left" | 2008–09
| align="left" | Marquette Golden Eagles
| 29 || 28 || 31.4 || .424 || .284 || .461 || 3.4 || 5.0 || 2.1 || .3 || 11.0

References

External links
 Dominic James at esake.gr
 Dominic James at tblstat.net
 Dominic James at espn.go.com

1986 births
Living people
African-American basketball players
Al-Gharafa SC basketball players
American expatriate basketball people in Bulgaria
American expatriate basketball people in France
American expatriate basketball people in Greece
American expatriate basketball people in Qatar
American expatriate basketball people in Serbia
American expatriate basketball people in Turkey
American men's basketball players
Aris B.C. players
Basketball players from Indiana
Greensboro Swarm players
KK Partizan players
Marquette Golden Eagles men's basketball players
Mersin Büyükşehir Belediyesi S.K. players
Pallacanestro Reggiana players
Point guards
Sportspeople from Richmond, Indiana
21st-century African-American sportspeople
20th-century African-American people